Chrysoxena is a genus of moths belonging to the subfamily Tortricinae of the family Tortricidae.

Species
Chrysoxena auriferana (Busck, 1911)

See also
List of Tortricidae genera

References

 , 2005: World catalogue of insects volume 5 Tortricidae.
 , 1912, Trans. ent. Soc. Lond. 1911: 685.

External links
tortricidae.com

Euliini
Tortricidae genera